Sharmin Ratna (born 24 March 1988) is a Bangladeshi sports shooter. She competed in the Women's 10 metre air rifle event at the 2012 Summer Olympics. She competed in the same event at the 2014 Commonwealth Games, finishing 6th.

References

External links
 

1988 births
Living people
Bangladeshi female sport shooters
Olympic shooters of Bangladesh
Shooters at the 2012 Summer Olympics
Shooters at the 2010 Asian Games
Shooters at the 2014 Asian Games
People from Magura District
Shooters at the 2014 Commonwealth Games
Commonwealth Games competitors for Bangladesh
Shooters at the 2018 Asian Games
Asian Games competitors for Bangladesh